Counter-economics is an economic theory and revolutionary method consisting of direct action carried out through the black market or the gray market. As a term, it was originally used by American libertarian activists and theorists Samuel Edward Konkin III and J. Neil Schulman. The former defined it as the study or practice "of all peaceful human action which is forbidden by the State".

The term is short for counter-establishment economics and may also be referred to as counter-politics. Counter-economics was integrated by Schulman into Konkin's doctrine of agorism, a left-libertarian social philosophy and branch of left-wing market anarchism that advocates creating a society in which all relations between people are voluntary exchanges.

Within libertarianism in the United States, counter-economics has been adopted by anarcho-capitalists, left-wing market anarchists, as well as more anti-capitalist anarchists.

Origins 
The first presentation of the theory of counter-economics was made by Samuel Edward Konkin III at a conference organized by J. Neil Schulman in 1974 held in Cheshire, Massachusetts. The first book to portray counter-economics as a strategy for achieving a libertarian society was Schulman's novel Alongside Night (1979).

Relationship with agorism 
Konkin's agorism, as exposited in his New Libertarian Manifesto, postulates that the correct method of achieving a voluntary society is through advocacy and growth of the underground economy or "black market" – the "counter-economy" as Konkin put it – until such a point that the State's perceived moral authority and outright power have been so thoroughly undermined that revolutionary market anarchist legal and security enterprises are able to arise from underground and ultimately suppress government as a criminal activity (with taxation being treated as theft, war being treated as mass murder, et cetera).

According to Konkin's pamphlet Counter-Economics:

According to Konkin, counter-economics also allows for immediate self-liberation from statist controls, to whatever degree practical, by applying entrepreneurial logic to rationally decide which laws to discreetly break and when. The fundamental principle is to trade risk for profit, although profit can refer to any gain in perceived value rather than strictly monetary gains (as a consequence of the subjective theory of value).

Voluntary practices of counter-economics include:
 Arms trafficking
 Bartering and alternative currency use
 Illegal migration or hiring illegal immigrants
 Drug trafficking
 Electricity theft or tapping
 Exchange of food stamps
 Mutual credit
 Off-the-grid energy and solar energy
 Smuggling
 Subsistence farming
 Tax evasion
 Prostitution

Strategy 
According to Per Bylund, counter-economics applies two basic strategies to liberate people from the state, vertical or introverted and horizontal or extroverted, arguing:

Vertical or introverted 
The vertical or introverted strategy is aimed towards individuals concentrating on decentralized local infrastructure as opposed to expansive state foundations and explained as such:

Voluntary association among those in a community is essential to this concept.  Bylund believes developing means to refuse dependency on state services and become self-reliant can be an effective course of action to achieve free market processes. Community technology is an example of this strategy. Bylund mentions Karl Hess's efforts to transform a Washington, D.C. neighborhood which reflects these principles as a primary example.  Hess set up green houses on top of available rooftops and using old washing machine parts to build a fish-breeding facility in a building basement.

Horizontal or extroverted 
The horizontal or extroverted strategy applies individuals actively creating black market networks and structures which can be stretched beyond neighborhood communities focus in the vertical strategy, with Bylund arguing as follows:

See also 

 Civil disobedience
 Economic secession
 Illegalism
 Informal sector
 The Other Path: The Economic Answer to Terrorism

References

External links
 The Agorism Project – Agorism.co
 Agorism: Revolutionary market anarchism 
 Just Things | The Fair Trade Journal of Applied Counter-Economics 
 Alongside Night by J. Neil Schulman

1974 introductions
Agorism
Economic ideologies
Free market
Libertarian terms
Libertarian theory
Libertarianism in the United States
Schools of economic thought